The High Sheriff of County Kilkenny was the British Crown's judicial representative in County Kilkenny, Ireland from the 16th century until 1922, when the office was abolished in the new Free State and replaced by the office of Kilkenny County Sheriff. The sheriff had judicial, electoral, ceremonial and administrative functions and executed High Court Writs. In 1908, an Order in Council made the Lord-Lieutenant the Sovereign's prime representative in a county and reduced the High Sheriff's precedence. However, the sheriff retained his responsibilities for the preservation of law and order in the county. The usual procedure for appointing the sheriff from 1660 onwards was that three persons were nominated at the beginning of each year from the county and the Lord Lieutenant then appointed his choice as High Sheriff for the remainder of the year. Often the other nominees were appointed as under-sheriffs. Sometimes a sheriff did not fulfil his entire term through death or other event and another sheriff was then appointed for the remainder of the year. The dates given hereunder are the dates of appointment. All addresses are in County Kilkenny unless stated otherwise.

High Sheriffs of County Kilkenny
1263: Geoffrey Forrestal
1302: William le Kyteler
1327: Fulk de la Freyne
1346: Roger de la Freyne
1382: John Sweetman
1385: Fulk de la Freyne, the younger 
1388: Gilbert Blancheville
1390: John Sweetman, second term 
1391: John Sweetman, third term 
1398: John FitzRichard Blancheville
1422: Robert Shorthalls 
1422: Anselm Grace
1447–1448: David Blanchewille
1450: David Blanchewille
1489: Piers Butler, 8th Earl of Ormond                          
1507: Walter Cowley  
1536: Rowland Fitzgerald (alias Barron), Baron of Burnchurch
1543: James Eweetman
1564: William Sweetman
1579: Richard Fitzgerald, Baron of Burnchurch
1579–1586: Walter Walsh of Castlehale
1588: Sir Richard Shee
1640: Edward Butler, 1st Viscount Galmoye
1654: John Ponsonby
1665: Edward Evans
1669: Tobias Cramer of Ballyfoyle
1678: Henry Webb of Ballinrobe
1683: Balthazer Cramer
1694: Ebenezer Warren of Lodge
1693: George Reade

18th century

19th century

20th century

References

 
Kilkenny
History of County Kilkenny